ASAA may refer to:

Alaska School Activities Association
Alberta Schools Athletic Association
American Sleep Apnea Association
Asian Studies Association of Australia
 A small town in northern Jutland, Denmark